The Archdiocese of Mérida–Badajoz is a Roman Catholic ecclesiastical territory in Spain, created in  1255. Until 1994, it was known as the Diocese of Badajoz.

History
The Diocese or Archdiocese of Mérida (dioecesis Emeritensis) was a Catholic and Arian see centred on the Spanish city of Mérida during the periods of Roman and Visigothic rule. Mérida was also the provincial capital of Lusitania.

The see prospered in the late 5th century under Zeno, a Greek, who was offered greater authority in order to defend the province from Suevic raids. At about that time the diocese fell under the control of the Visigoths and it remained a Visigothic see until the Moorish conquest of 711. Throughout that period, however, it only ever had two Gothic bishops: Masona and his successor Renovatus in the late sixth and early seventh centuries. In the mid-sixth century the see became the richest in Spain through the private wealth of bishops Paul and Fidelis, Greek uncle and nephew. Under these four, the city was ruled de facto by the bishops independent of the central government, a situation which led to conflict between the Arian king Leovigild and his bishop, Sunna.

The bishopric of Badajoz was erected in 1225, shortly after it was reconquered from the Moors by King Alfonso IX of León. Its first bishop was Don Pedro Perez, appointed by Alfonso X, the Wise. The diocese was suffragan to the archdiocese of Seville, and was bounded on the north by the diocese of Coria, diocese of Plasencia, and diocese of Toledo, on the east by Toledo, the diocese of Ciudad Real, and the diocese of Córdoba, on the south by the archdiocese of Seville, and on the west by Portugal.

On July 28, 1994, Pope John Paul II established the Archdiocese of Mérida–Badajoz, making the Church of Saint John Baptist his metropolitan cathedral.

Suffragan dioceses
 Coria–Cáceres
 Plasencia

Ordinaries

Diocese of Badajoz
Erected: 1255

Bishops before 1500

1500s

1600s

1700s

1800s

1900s

Archdiocese of Mérida–Badajoz
Elevated: 28 July 1994
Antonio Montero Moreno (3 May 1980 – 9 Jul 2004 Retired) 
Santiago García Aracil (9 Jul 2004 – 21 May 2015 Retired) 
Celso Morga Iruzubieta (21 May 2015 Succeeded – )

Auxiliary bishops
Fernando de Vera y Zuñiga (1614–1628).

Notes

References

 Originally published in El Concilio III de Toledo: XIV Centenario, 589–1989. Toledo: Arzobispado de Toledo, 1991.

Thompson, E. A. Romans and Barbarians: The Decline of the Western Empire. Madison: University of Wisconsin Press, 1982. .
.

Roman Catholic dioceses in Spain
Dioceses established in the 13th century